The Iceland men's national under-20 basketball team is the national representative for Iceland in men's international under-20 basketball tournaments. They are organized and run by the Icelandic Basketball Association. The team competes at the FIBA U20 European Championship.

History
Iceland competed at the 2017 FIBA U20 European Championship where the team made it to the final eight before bowing out against Israel.

U20 European Championship

See also
Iceland men's national basketball team
Iceland men's national under-19 basketball team
Iceland men's national under-17 basketball team

References

External links
Official website 
FIBA profile

 
National sports teams of Iceland
Men's national under-20 basketball teams